

Erich Geißler (11 December 1895 – 2 May 1967) was a German general in the Wehrmacht during World War II. He was a recipient of the Knight's Cross of the Iron Cross of Nazi Germany.

Awards and decorations

 Knight's Cross of the Iron Cross on 29 July 1942 as Oberst and commander of Infanterie-Regiment 200 (motorized) in DAK

References

Citations

Bibliography

 

1895 births
1967 deaths
People from Büdingen
Major generals of the German Army (Wehrmacht)
German Army personnel of World War I
Recipients of the clasp to the Iron Cross, 1st class
Recipients of the Knight's Cross of the Iron Cross
German prisoners of war in World War II held by the Soviet Union
People from the Grand Duchy of Hesse
Military personnel from Hesse